Bates is a common surname of English origin and is derived from the name Bartholomew. The name could also originate from the Old English "Bat", meaning "Boat", as used to identify a person whose occupation was boatman. Another origin is that which means "lush pasture", describing someone who lived near such a place.

At the time of the British Census of 1881, the relative frequency of the surname Bates was highest in Buckinghamshire (5.2 times the British average), followed by Leicestershire, Bedfordshire, Northamptonshire, Derbyshire, Staffordshire, Warwickshire, Huntingdonshire, Cambridgeshire and Oxfordshire.

Etymology of the word sets in with suffix -bate, e.g. rebate, also observed with abatement (i.e. gradient). As well found in forms like probation, describing corresponding change, and thus debate, surrounding centrifuges of context.

Notable people

A–D
Aaron Bates (born 1984), American baseball player and coach
Alan Bates (1934–2003), British actor
Albert Bates (born 1947), U.S. environmentalist
Allie Bates (born 1957), U.S. magazine writer
Alta Bates (1879–1955), American nurse anesthetist and founder of Alta Bates Hospital
Angelique Bates (born 1980), American actress
Anna Haining Bates (1846–1888), Canadian woman who stood 7'"
Arlo Bates (1850–1918), author and professor at Massachusetts Institute of Technology
Arthur Laban Bates (1859–1934), U.S. Representative from Massachusetts, 1901–13
Barbara Bates (1925–1969), U.S. actress and singer
Barrie Bates (born 1969), Welsh darts player
Benjamin Bates (disambiguation), multiple people
Benjamin Bates IV (1808–1878), philanthropist, founder of Bates College in Lewiston, Maine
Bill Bates (born 1961), U.S. player of American football
Billy Bates (1855–1900), English cricketer
Blanche Bates (1873–1941), American stage actress
Blaster Bates (1923–2006), British demolition expert
 Bob Bates, multiple people
Bob Bates (musician) (1923–1981), first bassist of The Dave Brubeck Quartet, 1951–58
Bob Bates (born 1953), U.S. game designer
Carl S. Bates (1884–1956), American aviation pioneer
Cary Bates (born 1948), American comic book writer
 Cat Bates (born 1986), child model for Jamie Wyeth and younger brother of Orca Bates
Charlotte Fiske Bates (1838–1916), American author
Clara Doty Bates (1838–1895), American author
Clara Nettie Bates (1876-1966), American editor, writer, clubwoman
 Clayton Peg Leg Bates (1907–1998), American entertainer
Daisy Bates (disambiguation), multiple people
Daisy Bates (civil rights activist) (Daisy Lee Gatson Bates, 1914–1999), U.S. civil rights activist
Daisy Bates (Australia) (Daisy May Bates, 1859–1951), Australian journalist
David Bates (disambiguation), multiple people
David Bates (historian) (born 1945), historian, writer of books about William I of England and Odo of Bayeux
David Bates (physicist) (1916–1994), physicist winner of the 1970 Hughes Medal
David Bates (poet) (1809–1870), U.S. poet
Dick Bates (born 1945), Major League Baseball pitcher
D'Wayne Bates (born 1975), U.S. player of American football

E–J
Edward Bates (1793–1869), U.S. jurist and politician, candidate for US president, 1860, and US Attorney General, 1861–1864
Elizabeth Bates (1947–2003), Professor of psychology and cognitive science at the University of California, San Diego
Emily Bates (born 1995), Australian rules footballer
Emoni Bates (born 2004), American basketball player
Erastus Newton Bates (1828–1898), American politician
Evan Bates (born 1989), American ice dancer
Frederick Bates (1777–1825), U.S. jurist and politician
George Joseph Bates (1891–1949), U.S. Representative from Massachusetts, 1937–49
George Latimer Bates (1863–1940), American naturalist
Gilbert Bates (1836–1917), Wisconsin Civil War veteran
Granville Bates (1882–1940), American actor
Guy Bates (born 1985), English footballer
H. E. Bates (Herbert Ernest Bates, 1905–1974), English writer and author
Harriet Bates (1856–1886), American writer
Harry Bates (disambiguation), multiple people
Harry Bates (sculptor) (1850–1899), British sculptor
Harry Bates (author) (1900–1981), U.S. science fiction writer
Henry Bates (disambiguation), multiple people
Henry Bates (politician), U.S. politician
Henry Moore Bates (1869–1949), American lawyer and president of the Order of the Coif
Henry Walter Bates (1825–1892), British zoologist
Henry Bates (British Army officer) (1813–1893), British general. 
Isaac Chapman Bates (1779–1845), U.S. Representative, 1827–35, and U.S. Senator 1841–45, from Massachusetts
James Bates (disambiguation), one of several people
Jamie Bates (born 1989), English welterweight kickboxer 
Jamie Bates (footballer) (born 1968), English footballer
Jason Bates (born 1971), U.S. professional baseball player
Jeanne Bates (1918–2007), U.S. actress
Jeff Bates (born 1963), U.S. country singer
Jeff Bates (technologist) (born 1976), U.S. businessman
Jennifer Bates (labor organizer), American labor organizer
Jeremy Bates (disambiguation), multiple people
Jeremy Bates (American football) (born 1976), American football coach
Jeremy Bates (boxer) (born 1974), American boxer
Jeremy Bates (tennis) (born 1962), British tennis player
Jessie Bates (born 1997), American football player
Jim Bates (disambiguation), multiple people
Jim Bates (politician) (born 1941), U.S. Representative from California, 1983–91
Jim Bates (American football) (born 1946), U.S. coach of American football
John Bates (disambiguation), multiple people
Johnny Bates (baseball) (1882–1949), baseball player
Joseph Bates (disambiguation), multiple people
Joseph E. Bates (1837–1900), 19th-century mayor of Denver, Colorado
Joseph Bates (Adventist) (1792–1872), U.S. Adventist and health reformist
Josephine White Bates (1862–1934), Canadian-born American author
Joshua Bates (disambiguation), multiple people
Joshua Bates (educator) (1776–1854), American minister and teacher
Joshua Bates (financier) (1788–1864), benefactor of Boston Public Library
Joshua Hall Bates (1817–1908), American Civil War general
Juanita Breckenridge Bates (1860–1946), American Congregationalist minister and suffragette

K–R
Katharine Lee Bates (1859–1929), U.S. poet
Kathy Bates (born 1948), U.S. actor
Ken Bates (Kenneth William Bates, born 1931), British businessman and football club owner/chairman
Lindon Wallace Bates (1858–1924), Civil engineer who designed the "three-lakes" of the Panama Canal
L. C. Bates (1904–1980), African-American civil rights activist
Lefty Bates (1920–2007), American Chicago blues guitarist
Leon Bates (pianist) (born 1949), American pianist
Leon Bates (American labor leader) (1899–1972), UAW Union Organizer
Leonard Bates (1895–1971), English cricketer
Madeleine Bates (born ), American computational linguistics researcher
Margret Holmes Bates (1844-1927), American author
Mario Bates (born 1973), U.S. player of American football
Marston Bates (1906–1974), U.S. zoologist
Martha E. Cram Bates (1839–1905), writer, journalist, newspaper editor
Martin Bates (disambiguation), multiple people
Martin Van Buren Bates (1837–1919), U.S. politician
Martin W. Bates (1786–1869), U.S. Senator from Delaware
Mason Bates (born 1977), American composer
Matthew Bates (born 1986), English footballer
Maxwell Bates (1906–1980), Canadian architect and artist
Michael Bates (disambiguation), one of several people
Mick Bates (disambiguation), one of several people
Morris Bates (1864–1905), English footballer
Nancy Bates, statistician with the US Census
Nicholas James Bates (born 1962), British musician known as Nick Rhodes
Orca Bates (born 1976), child model for Jamie Wyeth 
Paddy Roy Bates (1921–2012), pirate radio broadcaster and Sealand founder
Patricia Martin Bates (born 1927), artist
Paul L. Bates (1908–1995), Colonel, United States Army
Phil Bates (born 1953), guitarist and vocalist with the Orchestra (former members of ELO and ELO Part II)
 Ralph Bates, multiple people
Ralph Bates (writer) (1899–2000), English writer
Ralph Bates (1940–1991), English actor
Robert Bates (disambiguation), one of several people
Roger Bates (born 1947), American bridge player
Ronald Bates (1932–1986), New York City Ballet production stage manager
Ryan Bates (born 1997), American football player

S–Z
Samuel Penniman Bates (1827–1902), American educator
Sandra Bates, director of the Ensemble Theatre in Sydney, Australia, from 1986 to 2015
Sara Bates (born 1944), U.S. artist
Shawn Bates (born 1975), U.S. hockey player
Sidney Bates (1921–1944), British soldier
Simon Bates (born 1946), British radio presenter
Stuart 'Pinkie' Bates, organ/synthesizer player
Stephen Bates (born 1992), Australian politician
 Stephen Bates Baltes (1953–2003), American musical director for "Barney and the Backyard Gang" (1988–89)
Ted Bates (footballer) (1918–2003), English footballer
Thomas Bates (1567–1606), key conspirator in the Gunpowder Plot of 1605
Tom Bates (born 1938), U.S. politician
Tyler Bates (born 1965), U.S. musician
Tryphosa Bates-Batcheller (1876–1952), U.S. singer
William Bates (disambiguation), multiple people
William Henry Bates (1917–1969), U.S. Representative from Massachusetts, 1949–70
William Horatio Bates (1860–1931), creator of the "Bates Method for Better Eyesight"
Willis Bates (1880–1939), American college sports coach

Fictional characters 
Bates (Stargate), a character in Stargate
Kid Marvelman, a Marvel Comics character whose original name was Johnny Bates
 Eric, U.S. and Fancy Bates, characters in the 1982 film The Toy
John Bates, a character from Downton Abbey, married to Anna
Anna Bates, a character from Downton Abbey, married to John
Joshua T. Bates, a character of Susan Shreve
Nigel Bates, a character from the soap opera EastEnders
Norman Bates, a character from the 1960 film Psycho
Paul Bates, a character in the 2011 fantasy comedy movie Midnight in Paris
Tom, Amy, and Pattie Bates, characters in Dennis Potter's play Brimstone and Treacle

See also 
Bates (disambiguation)

References

English-language surnames
Patronymic surnames